The 1977–78 season was the 74th season of competitive football in Turkey.

Overview
Fenerbahçe won their ninth 1.Lig title in 1977–78. Cemil Turan, forward for Fenerbahçe, finished as top scorer with 17 goals. Trabzonspor finished runners-up, and Adanaspor finished third, their highest finish. Ankaragücü and Mersin İdmanyurdu were relegated to the 2.Lig, while Göztepe and MKE Kırıkkalespor were promoted to the 1.Lig. Trabzonspor won the Turkish Cup, Cumhurbaşkanlığı Kupası (Super Cup), and Başbakanlık Kupası (Chancellor Cup).

All clubs qualified for European competition (Trabzonspor, Fenerbahçe, Altay, and Beşiktaş) were knocked out in the first round of their respective competitions.

Awards
Gol Kralı (Goal King)
Cemil Turan (Fenerbahçe) – 17 goals

Honours

European qualification

Final league table

Notes
Tiebreakers are the average of goals scored to goals allowed.

Türkiye Kupası final
First leg

Second leg

National team
The Turkey national football team competed in seven matches during the 1977–78 season. The team finished with a record of one win, one draw, and five losses.

References